Hercegovščak is a settlement in the hills immediately west of Gornja Radgona in northeastern Slovenia.

References

External links
Hercegovščak on Geopedia

Populated places in the Municipality of Gornja Radgona